Sambhal Vidhan Sabha constituency is a constituency of the sambhal district of Uttar Pradesh, India.

Members of the Legislative Assembly

Election results

2022

2017
17th Vidhan Sabha: 2017 general elections

16th Vidhan Sabha: 2012 general elections

15th Vidhan Sabha: 2007 general elections

14th Vidhan Sabha: 2002 general elections

References

External links
 Official site of Legislature in Uttar Pradesh
 Uttar Pradesh Government website
 UP Assembly
 

Assembly constituencies of Uttar Pradesh
Sambhal